Hancock Central High School may refer to:

Hancock Central High School (Hancock, Michigan), Hancock, Michigan, US
Old Hancock Central High School, an NRHP-listed school in Hancock, Michigan
Hancock Central High School (Sparta, Georgia), Sparta, Georgia, US